Crataerina hirundinis is a species of flies belonging to the family Hippoboscidae. It was formerly placed in its own genus, Stenepteryx.

It is found in the  Palearctic.

This louse fly is known to be an ectoparasite on the house martin.

References

External links
 Images representing Stenepteryx hirundinis  at BOLD
 Bioimages

Hippoboscidae
Flies described in 1758
Muscomorph flies of Europe
Taxa named by Carl Linnaeus
Palearctic insects